The Pontarddulais Male Choir is a Welsh male voice choir from  Pontarddulais near Swansea, Wales. 
It is the most successful choir in Wales and is internationally renowned having performed in many parts of Europe as well as Canada and the United States.

It has achieved a record seventeen first place wins at the Royal National Eisteddfod, the latest of which was at Cardiff in 2018.  The choir also won the Choir of the Festival award in 2004 and 2006.

In 2001 and 2004 the Pontarddulais Male Choir won the Best Male Choir award at the Llangollen International Eisteddfod. Other first places  include 10 times at the Cardigan Eisteddfod,  5 times winners at the Miners Eisteddfod in Porthcawl and twice winners at the Pantyfedwen Eisteddfod in Pontrhydfendigaid.

The choir, conducted by Noel Davies, performed choral parts for the soundtrack of the film Pink Floyd – The Wall, including the track "When the Tigers Broke Free", which was released as a single; and recorded with Roger Waters on his album Radio K.A.O.S..

History 
Pontardulais Male Choir was established in 1960, under the leadership of the late Noel Davies MBE. It was borne out of the Pontarddulais Youth Choir which had become too old for youth competitions.

Under Noel's leadership  the choir won a record 11 firsts at the Royal National Eisteddfod of Wales, and one first at the International Eisteddfod, Llangollen until he  handed the role  to Clive Phillips in 2001, when he retired after 41 years unbroken service as Musical director.

Recordings 
The earliest known recording by the members of the Pontarddulais Male Choir was made in June 1962 in the Brangwyn Hall, Swansea at a Service given by the NFSH.  The conductor was T. Hayden Thomas, M.B.E., and the organist was Ivor Owen.  The 10" LP contained Rhyd-y-Groes, Calon Lan, Teyrnasoedd-y-Ddaear, Gracious Spirit of Thy Goodness, The Lord's My Shepherd, and "He That Shall Endure to the End" from Elijah. It was recorded by David Kent-Watson of Lawrence Recordings, later to become Cameo Classics.

[Hearts and Voices (2017) http://pontarddulaismalechoir.cymru/shop.html]

Songs from Wales Pontarddulais Male Choir /Iona Jones (Soprano) Pontarddulais Male Choir  (2007) 
Men Of Harlech, Clawss Madog, Y Blodyn A Holltodd Y Maen (The Flower That Shattered The Stone), Over The Rainbow (Iona Jones & Choir), Y Tangnefeddwyr (The Peace Makers), The Lord's Prayer, Take Me Home, Morte Criste (When I Survey The Wondrous Cross), Christus Salvator, Sweet Georgia Brown, Dashenka (Y Sipsiwn), Mil Harddach Wyt Na'r Rhosyn Gwyn, Tydi A Roddaist (Thou Gavest), Calon Lan, Li'l Liza Jane, Gwahoddiad, Cymru Fach (Iona Jones & Choir) (My Own Little Country), As Long As I Have Music

Great Voices of Wales: Choral Wonders (2006) 
Softly As I Leave You, Ride The Chariot, Diolch L'r Lor, Finnish Forest, Windmills Of Your Mind, Thanks Be To God, An Evening's Pastorale, Bryn Myrddin, Christus Redemptor, My Lord What A Mornin', Memory, Lord's Prayer, Bywyd Y Bugail, Mill Harddach Wyt Na'r Rhosyn Gwyn, Comrades In Arms

Sing Songs of England, Scotland, Ireland & Wales (1996)
Down Among The Dead Men,  Tom Bowling,  Linden Lea,  Golden Slumbers,  Annie Laurie,  Flow Gently Sweet Afton,  Ye Banks And Braes,  Will Ye No Come Back Again,  Oft In The Still Of The Night, Londonderry Air,  She Moves Through The Fair,  Cockles And Mussels,  March Of The Men Of Harlech,  All Through The Night,  Davis Of The White Rock,  Watching The Wheat

Softly As I Leave You (1994)
Softly As I Leave You, Ride The Chariot, Diolch I'r Ior, The Finnish Forest, The Windmills Of Your Mind, Thanks Be To God, An Evening's Pastorale, Bryn Myrddin, Christus Redemptor, My Lord What A Mornin', Memory, The Lord's Prayer, Bywyd Y Bugail, Mil Harddach Wyt Na'r Rhosyn Gwyn,  Comrades In Arms,

We'll Keep a Welcome (1993)

Sain Tawelwch (The Sound Of Silence)

Christmas From The Land of Song:The Massed Male Choirs of Morriston Orpheus Treorchy and Pontarddulais with The Band of The Welsh Guards  by Various (1995)

Land of my Fathers by Pontarddulais Male voice Choir, Morriston Orpheus Choir, and Caerphilly Male voice Choir

Patrons

 Shân Cothi
 Wyn Davies
 Ieuan Evans MBE
 Gareth Glyn
 Alun Guy
 Rt. Hon. Peter Hain MP
 Edwina Hart MBE, AM
 Brian Hughes
 H.M. Lord Lieutenant D Byron Lewis CStJ, FCA
 Dennis O'Neill
 Garry Owen
 Eirian Owen
 Elin Manahan Thomas
 Huw Tregelles Williams DL
 Haydn James
 John Hartson

References

External links 

malevoicechoir.net
City of Swansea
BBC Wales
choirs.org

Welsh choirs
Welsh culture
British choirs
Music in Swansea
Musical groups established in 1960
1960 establishments in Wales